Inspiration is a Hong Kong based Thoroughbred racehorse.

In the season of 2008–09, Inspiration catapulted himself from Class 2 winner in September at Happy Valley to shock 68–1 winner of the Cathay Pacific Hong Kong Sprint (G1-1200m) in December.. In February 2009, he lands a second career Group One in the Centenary Sprint Cup (1000m). Inspiration also is one of the nominees of Hong Kong Horse of the Year.

Profile
 Sire:  Flying Spur
 Dam: La Bamba
 Sex: Gelding
 Country : 
 Colour :  Chestnut
 Owner : Mr & Mrs Hui Sai Fun 
 Trainer : John Moore
 Record : 31: 9-6-2 (As of 27 February 2012)
 Earnings :  HK$15,528,450  (As of 27 February 2012)

References
 The Hong Kong Jockey Club – Egyptian Ra Racing Record
 The Hong Kong Jockey Club

Racehorses bred in Australia
Racehorses trained in Hong Kong
Hong Kong racehorses
Thoroughbred family 2-e